Loughton is a village and former civil parish, now in the parish of Wheathill, in the Shropshire district, in the ceremonial county of Shropshire, England. In 1961 the parish had a population of 48.

The Church of England parish church in Loughton is still used today, though the school is not. The church is not visible from the road and is accessed by going up three precarious stone steps on the far side of Church Farm, just off the road. In the churchyard is a very old yew tree. Every summer, there is an annual barbecue in the Church grounds and every Christmas there is a Carol Service with punch and mince pies post-service. The church itself is very plain and simple in design, with no stained glass windows.

History 
Loughton was formerly a chapelry in the parish of Chetton, In 1866 Loughton became a civil parish in its own right, on 1 April 1967 the parish was abolished and merged with Wheathill.

See also
Listed buildings in Wheathill

References

External links

Villages in Shropshire
Former civil parishes in Shropshire